The Puntland Municipal elections'''''' were held in Puntland, a state of Somalia, on October 25, 2021, with the preliminary elections in Qardho, Eyl and Ufayn electing councils for these three districts ahead of state-wide local council elections expected to take place in early 2022. The election was the first one under the principle of one man, one vote to be held in Somalia since 1969 and the state since its formation in 1998. 

Candidates in district elections run and are nominated by political parties. The mayor and District Council are then selected internally by the Councils at the first special sitting of the new legislative session.

Results 
The Transitional Puntland Electoral Commission (TPEC) successfully concluded elections in three districts — Qardho, Eyl, and Ufeyn on October 26.

Out of 87 council seats, 23 women emerged victoriously. In Qardho, 16,722 votes were cast, 15,343 were valid, and 1,379 invalid. Out of 33 seats, 24 were won by males and nine were by females. In Eyl, 6,766 votes were cast — 5,406 votes were valid and 1,360 invalid. A total of 21 seats were won by males and six won by females. The Ufeyn district saw 5,366 votes cast, with 4,739 valid votes and 627 ballots were deemed invalid. Nineteen were won by males and eight won by females.

International partners congratulated the people of Puntland for leading the way toward instituting a system of universal suffrage elections across Somalia. Similar municipal elections will be held in the remaining districts in 2022.

See Also

References

Elections in Somalia
Puntland
2021 in Somalia